Prince Dasho Ugyen Jigme Wangchuck (born 11 November 1994) is a member of the royal family of Bhutan and is the youngest of the sons of the fourth King of Bhutan Jigme Singye Wangchuck and his wife, Queen Mother Ashi Tshering Pem Wangchuck.

Royal duties
Ugyen Jigme Wangchuck has participated in a large amount of official royal matters including foreign affairs meetings. From 2008 Prince Dasho Ugyen Jigme Wangchuck has been educated in the exclusive Swiss boarding school, Institut Le Rosey. He attended the Early Learning Center in Thimphu, Bhutan, before going to Switzerland. He has now graduated high school. He now attends Central Saint Martins. He has two full sisters, Princess Ashi Chimi Yangzom Wangchuck, and Princess Ashi Kesang Choden Wangchuck, as well as 7 other half-siblings, including Jigme Khesar Namgyel Wangchuck.

He is active member of DeSuups, an organization made up of volunteers who go to the areas affected by some cataclysm or in charity events and who wear a familiar orange uniform to be easily recognizable. They are known as "Guardians of Peace".

Honours

  :
  Commemorative Silver Jubilee Medal of King Jigme Singye (02/06/1999). 
  King Jigme Khesar Investiture Medal (06/11/2008).
  Centenary of the Monarchy Commemorative Medal (06/11/2008).
  60th Birthday Badge Medal of King Jigme Singye (11/11/2015).
  The Royal Red Scarf (17/12/2021).

See also
 House of Wangchuck
 Line of succession to the Bhutanese throne

Notes

|-

1994 births
Living people
Bhutanese monarchy
Sons of kings
Alumni of Institut Le Rosey